Barf Kola (also Romanized as Bārf Kolā; also known as Bārfīkolā) is a village in Balatajan Rural District, in the Central District of Qaem Shahr County, Mazandaran Province, Iran. At the 2006 census, its population was 253, in 73 families.

References 

Populated places in Qaem Shahr County